Robert Cannell (born August 12, 1942) is a pediatrician who was a member of the Arizona State Senate and the Arizona House of Representatives. He was first elected to the House in November 2000, representing District 5. After redistricting in 2002, he won re-election to the House in District 24.  However, when Herb Guenther, who had won the State Senate seat, did not take the oath of office, Cannell was appointed by Yuma County Board of Supervisors to replace him. Cannell won re-election to the Senate in 2004. He did not run for re-election in 2006.

References

Democratic Party Arizona state senators
Democratic Party members of the Arizona House of Representatives
1942 births
Living people